Andingmen Station is a station on Line 2 of the Beijing Subway.  The station is named after Andingmen, a city gate in Beijing's city wall, which was torn down during the construction of the subway in the late 1960s.

Station layout 
The station has an underground island platform.

Exits 
There are 2 exits, lettered A and B. Exit A is accessible.

References

External links
 

Railway stations in China opened in 1984
Beijing Subway stations in Dongcheng District